Qarah Aghaj-e Pain (also Romanized as Qarah Āghāj-e Pā’īn; also known as Qarah Āghājlū-ye Pā’īn) is a village in Angut-e Gharbi Rural District, Anguti District, Germi County, Ardabil Province, Iran. At the 2006 census, its population was 738, in 168 families.

References 

Towns and villages in Germi County